Inedito (English: All New or Unpublished) is the eleventh studio album by Italian singer Laura Pausini, released by Atlantic Records in November 2011. This is Pausini's comeback album, after two years of silence. The name of the album was confirmed on the dawn of 10 September 2011. The album was previewed with the release of the single "Benvenuto", which debuted at number one on the Italian Singles Chart.
The second single from the album was "Non ho mai smesso", followed by "Bastava", released on 20 January 2012.

The Spanish-language version of the album, titled Inédito, was released on 11 November 2011 as a digital download in Spain, and on 15 November 2011 as a CD both in Spain and in Latin America.

In December 2011, Pausini embarked on the Inedito World Tour to promote the album, first in Italy, then coming to Latin America. In March 2012 Pausini returned to Italy, then she continued with a European leg until August 2012. A return to Latin America, North America and Australia was planned and the tour was originally going to end in December 2012 with a new set of concerts in Italy, but on 15 September 2012 Pausini announced her pregnancy and cancelled the remaining shows of the tour.
The album has sold 1,000,000 copies worldwide.

Background
After announcing in late 2009 that she would have been out of the spotlight for two years, Pausini broke her silence in early January 2011, when her website reported that Pausini's eleventh studio album would be released in late 2011.

Starting from 11 January 2011, Pausini's website was monthly renewed, adding information about her new studio album and the  Inedito World Tour. On 10 September 2011, Pausini revealed the artwork and the track list of her album. The following day, the first single from Inedito, "Benvenuto", was made available in streaming through Pausini's official website. The song was officially released on 12 September 2011.

On 9 November 2011, via her official Facebook page, Pausini confirmed "Non ho mai smesso", released in Italy on 11 November, as the second single from the album.

In March 2012, Pausini announced that the title song, "Inedito", would not be ever released as a single, since the co-singer of that song, Gianna Nannini, was currently on vacation and did not promote it. Thus, "Mi tengo" was released as the fourth single, on 23 March 2012.

In May 2012, Pausini announced that the fifth single from the album would be "Le cose che non-mi aspetto", which was released on 25 May 2012.

The last single from the album is going to be "Celeste" (in Italy) and "Las cosas que no me espero" (in Spain and Latin America, featuring Carlos Baute), both to be released on 5 November 2012. Originally, "Troppo tempo" was going to be chosen as the last single (with its music video already been recorded), but when Pausini discovered she was pregnant she changed her mind and chose such song.

Writing, composition and recording
In October 2011, during a promotional tour in Mexico, Pausini explained that the title Inedito refers to the creative process of the album, described as very different from the one that led to her previous studio sets, because for the first time she conceived and wrote the whole album without any pressure, in the privacy of her home, instead of working on it in airports and hotel rooms.

Describing the musical style of the album, Pausini claimed that it will include songs with a wide range of influences:
"It's a complete album from the musical point of view, because there are a lot of differences between each song. It is influenced by rock, but it also features ballads and melodies with music by Italian and English orchestras."

The album features guest appearances by Italian singer-songwriters Gianna Nannini, with whom Pausini duets in the title-track, and Ivano Fossati, who performs a guitar solo in "Troppo tempo" / "Hace tiempo".

The track "Tutto non-fa te" / "Lo que tú me das" is dedicated to Pausini's mother, while "Nel primo sguardo" / "A simple vista" was written by Pausini thinking about her younger sister, Silvia, with whom she duets in the Italian version of the song.

"Nel primo sguardo" is by far the only song ever released and recorded by Pausini in four different languages: Spanish, Italian, Portuguese and French. A 10-second snippet of an English version of the song was sung live by Pausini during a press conference. Also, after the album was released, during a radio broadcast, Pausini sang a snippet of an English version of "Celeste". Later it was confirmed that "Nel primo sguardo" was first written in English, under the name Beautiful, but Pausini did not find words for the chorus at first. Then, when her friend Carolina Leal translated the original version into Portuguese, Pausini knew the song would be good.

The track "Ti dico ciao" / "Te digo adiós" is dedicated to Pausini's late friend, Giuseppe. Indeed, she planted a tree in front of her house, alluding to the lyrics of the song.

The track "Celeste" / "Así Celeste" was written by Pausini after, on many occasions, the media constantly said she was pregnant, when indeed she was not. As declared by herself, the song's lyrics is exactly what she would say to her baby when she actually has one.

Promotion
On 11 November 2011, Pausini promoted her album appearing on the first episode of the new TV show by Italian presenter Piero Chiambretti, the Chiambretti Muzic Show, during which she sang a few tracks from Inedito.

The tour to promote the album started on 22 December 2011 from Milan. The Inedito World Tour will reach Latin America in January and February 2012. In March 2012, Pausini will be back in Italy for a second Italian leg of the tour, while in April and May she will give concerts throughout the rest of Europe.

Track listing

Inedito

Inédito

Deluxe version
The deluxe edition of Inedito includes both the Italian-language and the Spanish-language versions of the album, and also features 5 additional tracks:

Special edition
The special editions of Inedito and Inédito contain the two original CDs plus a live bonus track recorded on 31 December 2011 and a live DVD of the Inedito World Tour.

Personnel
Credits adapted from Inedito liner notes.

Production credits
 Massimo Aluzzi – engineer
 Marco Barusso – engineer
 Simone Bertolotti – producer
 Marco Borsatti – engineer, mixing
 Andy Bradfield – mixing
 Jason Carmer – engineer
 Renato Cantele – engineer, mixing
 Enrico Capalbo – assistant
 Paolo Carta – engineer, producer
 Luca Chiaravalli – pre-production
 Fiona Cruickshank – Pro Tools
 Luigi De Maio – engineer
 Samuele Dessì – engineer
 Nicola Fantozzi – engineer, assistant
 Mo Hausler – assistant
 Jake Jackson – engineer
 Davide Palmiotto – assistant
 Angelo Paracchini – assistant
 Laura Pausini – producer
 Corrado Rustici – producer
 Giuseppe Salvadori – assistant
 Celso Valli – mixing, producer
 Daniel Vuletic – pre-production, producer

Music credits
 Leo Abrahams – guitar
 Niccolò Agliardi – backing vocals, composer
 Prisca Amori – orchestra leader
 Dave Arch – piano
 B.I.M. Orchestra – orchestra
 Emiliano Bassi – drums, percussions
 Matteo Bassi – bass, composer
 Simone Bertolotti – additional keyboards, piano, Rhodes piano, glockenspiel, composer, arrangements, orchestra conductor
 C.V. Ensamble orchestra – orchestra
 Paolo Carta – guitar, computer programming, harmonica, backing vocals, composer, arrangements, orchestra conductor
 Luca Chiaravalli – backing vocals, additional computer programming, composer
 Cesare Chiodo – bass
 Valentino Corvino – leader
 Beppe Dati – composer
 Edoardo De Angelis – orchestra leader
 Samuele Dessì – acoustic guitar, electric guitar, computer programming
 Nathan East – bass
 Niccolò Fabi – composer
 Gianluigi Fazio – backing vocals
 Steve Ferrone – drums, percussions
 Ivano Fossati – electric guitar, vocals
 Elvezio Fortunato – electric guitar
 Marzia Gonzo – backing vocals
 Nick Ingman – arrangements, orchestra conductor
 Frank Martin – piano
 Gianna Nannini – vocals
 Everton Nelson – orchestra leader
 Andy Pask – bass
 Nicola Oliva – acoustic guitar
 Orchestra Edodea Ensemble – orchestra
 Goffredo Orlandi – composer
 Laura Pausini – vocals, composer, backing vocals
 Silvia Pausini – vocals
 Massimiliano Pelan – composer
 Kaveh Rastegar – bass
 Andrea Rigonat – electric guitar
 Royal Philharmonic Orchestra – orchestra
 Tommy Ruggero – percussion
 Corrado Rustici – guitar, keyboards, treatments, beats, arrangements, orchestra conductor
 Rosaria Sindona – backing vocals
 Solis String Quartet – orchestra
 Ian Thomas – drums
 Giuseppe Tortora – contractor
 Michael Urbano – drums
 Celso Valli – piano, Hammond organ, keyboards, armonium, orchestra conductor
 Paolo Valli – drums, arrangements
 Massimo Varini – acoustic guitar, electric guitar
 Daniel Vuletic – composer, arrangements
 Paolo Zampini – flute
 Bruno Zucchetti – piano, Hammond organ, keyboards, computer programming

Charts

Weekly charts

Year-end charts

Certifications and sales

Release history

References

2011 albums
Laura Pausini albums
Atlantic Records albums
Italian-language albums
Spanish-language albums